Harry Irving Thayer (September 10, 1869 – March 10, 1926) was a member of the United States House of Representatives from Massachusetts.  He was born in Pembroke on September 10, 1869. He attended the public schools of Hanover and engaged in the leather business. He was an organizer and president of the Thayer-Ross Co., president of the New England Shoe and Leather Association, and president of the Tanners’ Council of the United States.  Thayer  was a delegate to the Republican National Convention in 1924, and was elected as a Republican to the Sixty-ninth Congress.  He served from March 4, 1925, until his death in Wakefield on March 10, 1926.  His interment was in Lakeside Cemetery.

See also
List of United States Congress members who died in office (1900–49)

External links
 
 
 

1869 births
1926 deaths
People from Pembroke, Massachusetts
Republican Party members of the United States House of Representatives from Massachusetts
Burials in Massachusetts